The 30 kilometre cross-country skiing event was part of the cross-country skiing programme at the 1984 Winter Olympics, in Sarajevo, Yugoslavia. It was the eighth appearance of the 30 km race. The competition was held on Friday, 10 February 1984, at Veliko Polje, Igman. Of the 72 athletes who started the race, three were disqualified.

Nikolay Zimyatov of the Soviet Union successfully regained his Olympic title. His fellow countryman Alexander Zavyalov took silver with Sweden's Gunde Svan taking bronze.

Results

References

External links
Official Olympic Report

Men's cross-country skiing at the 1984 Winter Olympics
Men's 30 kilometre cross-country skiing at the Winter Olympics